Unlock, unlocking and unlockable may refer to:

Bypassing security
 To undo a lock (security device)
 Phone unlocking, the removal of a SIM lock on a mobile phone
iOS jailbreaking, removing the limitations imposed by Apple, Inc. on iOS devices
 Rooting (Android), allowing users of Android devices to obtain root access within Android's subsystem (similar to iOS jailbreaking)

Video games
 Unlockable (gaming), content that is available in video games but not accessible unless something is performed by the user to access to it
 Unlockable character, characters that can be unlocked in a video game
 Unlockable games, full video games that can be unlocked within another video game, often as easter eggs

Other
Unlock (charity), a British charity
 Unlock (album), a 2018 album by Day6
 "Unlock" (song), a 2016 song by KAT-TUN

See also 
 Unlocked (disambiguation)
 Lock (disambiguation)